Hammer Hill Park is a park along Fung Tak Road, near Nan Lian Garden, in Kowloon, Hong Kong.

References

External links
 

Urban public parks and gardens in Hong Kong
Wong Tai Sin District